Mahall ol Din (also Romanized as Maḩall ol Dīn and Maḩall od Dīn; also known as Maḩall Dīn, Maḩalled Dīn, and Maḩl od Dīn) is a village in Khesht Rural District, Khesht District, Kazerun County, Fars Province, Iran. At the 2006 census, its population was 370, in 83 families.

References 

Populated places in Kazerun County